Australian Ninja Warrior is a sports entertainment competition spin-off of the Japanese television series Sasuke which premiered on 9 July 2017 on the Nine Network. It features hundreds of competitors attempting to complete series of obstacle courses of increasing difficulty, in hopes of advancing to the finals and becoming the season's "Australian Ninja Warrior."

In September 2022, the series was cancelled by Nine and won’t return in 2023.

History
The series was announced in 2016 with applications open until 9 September 2016, with filming between November & December 2016 on Cockatoo Island. The series was officially confirmed at Nine's upfronts in November 2016 with Rebecca Maddern announced as host. A few days after the announcement, Ben Fordham was announced as second host & Freddie Flintoff as the series' sideline reporter. The series began airing on 9 July 2017.

The series was renewed for a second season during the season one final which was filmed between December 2017 & January 2018, with applications that closed by 3 September 2017. On 11 October 2017, the series was officially confirmed for renewal at Nine's upfronts, also confirming Fordham, Maddern & Flintoff returning for the second season. The second season began airing on 8 July 2018.

On 17 October 2018, the series was officially renewed for a third season at Nine's upfronts, also confirming Fordham, Maddern & Flintoff returning for the third season. Filming for the series was relocated to Spotswood in Melbourne with filming commencing 15 November until 1 December. The third season began airing on 8 July 2019.

On 17 October 2019, the series was officially renewed for a fourth season at Nine's upfronts, also confirming Fordham, Maddern & Flintoff returning for the fourth season. The series will again be relocated, filming will take place at Melbourne Showgrounds in Ascot Vale. Due to the COVID-19 pandemic, Nine has introduced Audience Lock-out meaning members of the public can not attend as audience, only family members of contestants will be allowed to attend, as well as co-host Rebecca Maddern, who was put in self-isolation, was temporarily replaced by Shane Crawford for two heats, she has since been cleared and returned to filming. Crawford returned to the season as sideline commentator for the Semis and Grand Final after Freddie Flintoff had to fly back to the UK before coronavirus pandemic measures came into effect.  The fourth season began airing on 26 July 2020.

Ben Polson became the first contestant to win after four seasons. His prize was $400,000 and the title of ‘Australian Ninja Warrior’.

Nine Network announced a fifth season on 16 September 2020. Casting applications are open until 30 November 2020. The series was again relocated, filming took place in Homebush, New South Wales. In June 2021, Nine announced Nick Kyrgios would be joining the series as a sideline commentator alongside Shane Crawford; Freddie Flintoff will not be returning due to travel challenges and a busy schedule. The fifth season began airing on 20 June 2021.

On 15 September 2021, the series was officially renewed for a sixth season at Nine's upfronts. In October 2021, Fordham quit as series host. In November 2021, Nine announced Madderns contract was not renewed and she would be leaving the network effective immediately, in which she will be resigning as the show's host. In January 2022, Jim Courier and Leila McKinnon were announced as the new hosts of the series, with Will & Woody as sideline commentators. The sixth season began airing on 27 June 2022.

Format
Potential contestants go through a rigorous series of obstacles before the possibility of becoming the next Australian Ninja Warrior and win a cash prize, starting at $100,000. If there is no winner in a season the prize will jackpot and rise by $100,000 until someone eventually conquers Mount Midoriyama.

From the third season, the format changed slightly with the most successful contestant who goes the furthest and fastest guaranteed to win $100,000 should they not conquer the course, but will win the growing jackpot should they conquer Mount Midoriyama.

Series overview

Cast and seasons

Season 1 (2017)

The first season premiered on 9 July 2017, on Nine Network and concluded on 25 July 2017. The season was filmed on Cockatoo Island, Sydney where 50 ninjas ran in each of the six qualifying heats, with the top 18 from each heat moving on to the Semi-finals. From the three semi finals, the top 7 competitors moved on to the Grand Final. 9 Competitors finished stage one of the Grand Final, but none completed stage two.

Season 2 (2018)

The second season premiered on 8 July 2018, on Nine Network and concluded on 31 July 2018. The season was filmed on Cockatoo Island, Sydney. In this season there was a total of over 300 ninjas, each was placed into one of the six heats, with the top 20 in each heat advancing to the semi-finals. In each of the four semi-finals, the top 8 competitors continued to the Grand Final. In the Grand Final, stage one was completed by 24 competitors, though none of them completed stage two.

Season 3 (2019)

The third season premiered on 8 July 2019 on the Nine Network. The season was filmed in Spotswood, Victoria; and featured 200 ninjas competing across five heats. The top 18 ninjas in each heat advanced to the semi-finals, and the top ten competitors in each of the three semi-finals qualified for the Grand Final.

In the Grand Final, there were eleven ninjas who successfully completed the first stage of the course. Five competitors progressed to stage three, however all failed to complete this stage.  Despite all five ninjas failing at the same obstacle, Charlie Robbins was deemed to be the "Last Ninja Standing" and awarded the $100,000 prize as he was the fastest ninja to reach this point. However, the series did not have an official "winner", as to win one must conquer the mountain. This season was the first time on Australian Ninja Warrior that any contestant had qualified for the third stage of the course.

Season 4 (2020)

The fourth season premiered on 26 July 2020, on Nine Network. The season was filmed at Melbourne Showgrounds, Melbourne. In this season there was a total of over 140 ninjas, each was placed into one of the four heats, with the top 16 in each heat advancing to the semi-finals. In both of the two semi-finals, the top 12 competitors continued to the Grand Final where eight ninjas successfully completed the first stage of the course, four completed the second stage and three completed the third stage. Ben Polson was the fastest of the remaining three and was able to climb Mount Midoriyama in 25.56, earning him the title as the first legitimate winner of Australian Ninja Warrior and received $400,000.

Season 5 (2021)

The fifth season premiered on 20 June 2021, on Nine Network. The season was filmed at Sydney Olympic Park, New South Wales. In this season there was a total of over 200 ninjas, each was placed into one of the four heats, with the top 20 in each heat advancing to the Semi-finals and with each winner of the Power Tower advancing straight to the Grand Final or getting a second chance advantage and winning $200,000.

Season 6 (2022)

The sixth season premiered on 27 June 2022, on Nine Network. The season was filmed at Qudos Bank Arena in Sydney Olympic Park, New South Wales. In this season there was a total of over TBA ninjas, each was placed into one of the four heats, with the top 18 in each heat advancing to the semi-finals and with each winner of the Power Pool gaining an advantage in the semi-final.

Viewership

International broadcasts
On Australia Day, UK game show based channel, Challenge, announced that beginning from 18 February 2018, it would start airing episodes of Australian Ninja Warrior.

In 2021, UK broadcaster ITV broadcast Series 3 in the lunchtime slot.

Specials

ANW: State of Origin

Announced in August 2020, a two-part series set to premiere on 16 August 2020, will see the best four ninjas from each state competing against each other on a new custom built obstacle courses with the winning team receiving $100,000.

The special will have 20 returning contestants split into four groups from five different states, the power tower will also return for both parts.

Ben Poulson of Team Western Australia won the special coming head to head against Ashlin Herbert of Team Victoria in the final round, the team received $100,000 giving all four team contestants $25,000 each.

Courses

Night 1 
On Night 1, the same course is used in the first three rounds, but with different number of members (4, 2, solo) on the course that comprises 9 obstacles.

 Snake Run (1st leg, 1st leg)
 Propeller Bar to Single Rope Swing (1st, 1st)
 6m Spinning Log (2nd, 1st)
 Salmon Ladder to 2 Flying Shelves (2nd, 1st)
 2 Basket Tosses (3rd, 1st)
 Warped Wall (3rd, 2nd)
 Barrel Rolls (4th, 2nd)
 Spider Jump (4th, 2nd)
 Chimney Sweep with Double Door at the top to buzzer (4th, 2nd)

At the end of each stage, the fastest team advance straight to Day 2.
At the end of the three stages, the two slowest team select a member compete in the power tower. The slowest is eliminated.

Night 2 
With South Australia eliminated, four remaining teams will battle in three rounds, where one team is eliminated at the end of each round.

Round 1 
In round 1, the team will be split into pairs, and each pair run course A of 6 obstacles. The team with the fewest obstacles cleared or the slowest time to finish all 12 obstacles will be eliminated. Western Australia had Sam Goodall running the course twice, but in different order because Zed Colback is medically eliminated due to migrane.

 Rope Jungle (1st)
 Spin Hopper
 2x Bar Hops
 Double Squirrel (2nd)
 Double Ferris Wheel
 20/30/40 kg Wall Lifts

Ratings

Australian Ninja Warrior: Record Breakers 
In 2021, the TV special follows a day after the broadcast of Grand Final. This was also the final show that Ben Fordham would be hosting. It is so called as Australian National and Guinness World Records (previously held in the American series) for each obstacle would be attempted, and AU$15,000 for each obstacle conquered, including the World Record for the highest warped wall (5.8m), the highest salmon ladder (where the final 35m Mt. Midoriama climb is replaced by a 29-rung salmon ladder climb), Ferris wheel race between Olivia Vivian and Andrea Ha, the first woman to ever made it up the warped wall.

See also

 List of Australian television series
 List of programs broadcast by Nine Network

References

External links
 Australian Ninja Warrior on Channel 9
 Australian Ninja Warrior - Season 1 on Channel 9
 Australian Ninja Warrior Blog, Articles, Videos & Forums

 
Nine Network original programming
2010s Australian game shows
2017 Australian television series debuts
Television series by Endemol
English-language television shows
Ninja Warrior (franchise)
Australian television series based on Japanese television series
Impact of the COVID-19 pandemic on television
Television shows set in Melbourne